Göran Pettersson (born 1 October 1961) is a Swedish weightlifter. He competed in the men's heavyweight II event at the 1984 Summer Olympics.

References

External links
 

1961 births
Living people
Swedish male weightlifters
Olympic weightlifters of Sweden
Weightlifters at the 1984 Summer Olympics
People from Knivsta Municipality
Sportspeople from Uppsala County
20th-century Swedish people